Cellvibrio fibrivorans is a bacterium from the genus of Cellvibrio which has been isolated from soil from a Botanic garden in Ghent in Belgium.

References

Pseudomonadales
Bacteria described in 2003